Vanua Lava Airport , also known as Sola Airport, is an airport near Sola on the island of Vanua Lava, one of the Banks Islands in the Torba province in Vanuatu.

Facilities

Airlines and destinations

References

External links
 
 

Airports in Vanuatu
Torba Province